Dan Duščak (born 2 July 2002) is a Slovenian professional basketball player for CB Gran Canaria of the Liga ACB. He is a 1.85m tall point guard.

Professional career
Duščak made his first basketball steps in KK Grosuplje. In 2017 he moved to Real Madrid where he played for its youth selections. 

On 3 July 2020 Duščak signed his first professional with Cedevita Olimpija.

Personal life
His father, Slavko Duščak, is a former international basketball player. Currently, he is a basketball coach at ŽKK Grosuplje.

References

External links
 Eurobasket.com profile
 REALGM profile
 PROBALLERS profile

2002 births
Living people
ABA League players
KK Cedevita Olimpija players
Point guards
Slovenian men's basketball players
Basketball players from Ljubljana